Panic in the Skies! is a 1996 American made-for television disaster film that is directed by Paul Ziller and was premiered on The Family Channel on October 13, 1996.  The film stars Kate Jackson, Ed Marinaro  and Erik Estrada.

Plot
During take-off for a flight to Europe, Royce Air International Flight 115 (a Boeing 747-200 flying from New York to London) is struck by lightning. Although the flight continues, the lightning strike has killed the flight crew and disabled the radio communications to the ground. Laurie Ann Pickett (Kate Jackson), the senior flight attendant, enlists the aid of passenger Brett Young (Ed Marinaro), and together, they determine that the autopilot can bring the aircraft in for a landing.

The autopilot that they rely on, begins to malfunction, homing in on airfield transponders at random, even airports that are too small to accommodate the large jet-liner. Both Laurie and Brett realize they may have to find a way to land the aircraft by themselves. Veering to a completely new heading, the airliner turns from its flightpath over the Atlantic Ocean to fly to the Pacific Coast of North America. A small sub-plot, though not relevant to the malfunctioning autopilot, is a rottweiler that broke free in the cargo hold and becomes a small menace to the passengers. The dog is eventually befriended and calmed down, as it was only aggravated due to stress.

On the ground, FAA Air Traffic Control officials who have lost radio contact with the 747, start a debate as to when the aircraft should be shot down to prevent a more disastrous crash in a heavily populated area. Tensions begin to come to a head on board the stricken airliner, with a landing at Vancouver, British Columbia, becoming their only option.

Cast

 Kate Jackson as Laurie Ann Pickett
 Ed Marinaro as Brett Young 
 Erik Estrada as Ethan Walker
 Maureen McCormick as Flight Attendant 
 Billy Warlock as F.A. Matt Eisenhauer
 Robert Guillaume as Rob Barnes
 Marilyn Norry as Donna Preston
 Howard Dell as Charles Buckman (credited as Howard G.H. Dell)
 Robert Maloney as passenger
 Brandy Ledford as F.A. Charlene Davis
 Kehli O'Byrne as Tukey, Walker's Assistant
 Michael Buie as Darryl (credited as Mike Buie)
 Ken Camroux as Derek Green
 Marc Baur as Ed Handler
 Brett Stone as Lydia Chambers
 Michael Gelbart as Joel Rose

Production
Principal photography on Panic in the Skies took place in Vancouver, British Columbia.

Reception
While not reviewed by critics in mainstream media, Panic in the Skies did garner some interest from internet bloggers and other film critics. Film reviewer Sergio Ortega noted the "unfortunately bad movie ...",  was filled with continuity and "unbelievable" aerial errors on the Boeing 747.

References

External links
 

1996 television films
1996 films
ABC Family original films
American aviation films
Disaster television films
1990s disaster films
Films set on airplanes
Films about aviation accidents or incidents
MTM Enterprises films
Films directed by Paul Ziller
1990s American films